Irene is an unincorporated community in Hill County, Texas. It is located approximately twelve miles southeast of Hillsboro, near the intersection of FM 308 and FM 1946.

Irene had an estimated population of 170 in 2000. Area students attend school in the nearby town of Bynum's supporting school district. It has a post office and its ZIP code is 76650.

References

External links

Irene, Texas – Texas Escapes Online Magazine.

Unincorporated communities in Hill County, Texas
Unincorporated communities in Texas